Valentine Edward Charles Browne, 6th Earl of Kenmare (29 May 1891 – 20 September 1943), styled Viscount Castlerosse from 1905 to 1941, was the Earl of Kenmare and the son of Valentine Browne, 5th Earl of Kenmare.

Lord Castlerosse, an Anglo-Irish nobleman, served in the First World War as a captain in the Irish Guards and was severely wounded. He returned to London and entered the banking business for a period but soon became a journalist, best known for his widely read ‘Londoner’s Log’. He was a journalist for the Sunday Express, and a director of the Evening Standard, the Daily Express and the Sunday Express, and great friend of their publisher, Lord Beaverbrook.  After he became a regular columnist for the Sunday Express in April 1926, his "witty but unmalicious commentary" on contemporary public life made him "the most celebrated gossip columnist in the British press" of his time. He also wrote the screenplay for the 1932 film comedy Diamond Cut Diamond and the story for the 1942 film about Amy Johnson, They Flew Alone.

He was active in Killarney affairs, creating a lakeside golf course and supporting Killarney Races.

Marriages
Lord Castlerosse was married twice, his wives being:
(Jessie) Doris Delevingne (1900–1942), the first child of Edward Charles Delevingne, a butter importer, and his wife, the former Jessie Marion Homan, and great-aunt of models Poppy Delevingne and Cara Delevingne. They were married on 16 May 1928 and divorced in 1938; no issue. She died of an overdose of sleeping pills at the Dorchester Hotel, in London's Park Lane.
Enid Maude, Viscountess Furness (1892–1973), widow of Marmaduke Furness, 1st Viscount Furness, and daughter of Charles Lindeman. An Australian wine heiress, she was previously married to, and widowed by, Roderick Cameron Sr. and Brig. Gen. Frederick W.L.S.H. Cavendish. They married in 1943. By this marriage Lord Castlerosse had three stepchildren: Roderick Cameron Jr., Patricia Enid Cavendish, and Frederick C.P. Cavendish, 7th Baron Waterpark.

He died in September 1943 aged 52 and is buried in the family vault in Killarney Cathedral.

References

Bibliography

Leonard Mosley (1956). Castlerosse. London
George Malcolm Thomson (1973). Lord Castlerosse His Life and Times. London

1891 births
1943 deaths
Alumni of Trinity College, Cambridge
Irish Guards officers
Kenmare, Valentine Browne, 10th Viscount
British Army personnel of World War I
6
Valentine